Thingaza Monastery is a historic Buddhist monastery in Chanmyathazi Township,  Mandalay, Burma. The monastery was established donated by King Mindon Min to the Thingaza Sayadaw in 1861. Thingaza Monastery is listed among the buildings being maintained by the Department of Archaeology. The monastery, built with 232 teak pillars, includes a shrine hall, a donation hall, and a zetawun hall.

See also 

 Kyaung

References 

Monasteries in Myanmar
Buddhist temples in Mandalay
19th-century Buddhist temples
Religious buildings and structures completed in 1839